Pend Oreille National Forest was established by the U.S. Forest Service in Idaho on May 6, 1910 with  by the renaming of Pend d'Oreille National Forest, which in turn had been established on July 1, 1908 with  from Cabinet, Coeur d'Alene, Kootenai and Priest River National Forests.  On September 30, 1933 most of the forest was transferred to Kaniksu National Forest and the remainder was transferred to Coeur d'Alene. The name was discontinued.

References

External links
Forest History Society
Forest History Society:Listing of the National Forests of the United States Text from Davis, Richard C., ed. Encyclopedia of American Forest and Conservation History. New York: Macmillan Publishing Company for the Forest History Society, 1983. Vol. II, pp. 743-788.

Former National Forests of Idaho